Klaus Leidorf (born 5 June 1956) is a German aerial archaeologist.

Early life
From 1976 to 1983 he studied Protestant theology and pre- and early history in Bonn and Marburg. Followed by a position as a scientific assistant at the University of Marburg from 1983 to 1985 and as an employee at the Bavarian State Office for the Preservation of Historical Monuments from 1985 to 1989.
In 1988 he followed his fascination for aviation and photography and got his private pilot licence. Since then he has been working as an aerial archaeologist with the focus on Bavaria.
Furthermore, he had lectureships at the Universities of Marburg, Würzburg and the Ruhr-University Bochum. 
He founded the publishing company Verlag Marie Leidorf, one of the larger German-language publishers for archaeological literature.
Besides the tracing of countless undiscovered ancient monuments his interest rises for the aerial documentation. Since the turnaround he took photos of the German Green Belt, the former border between East and West Germany, in the years 1996, 2003 and 2008.
Besides his documental work, he has accumulated a vast collection of artistic photographs from the birds eye view. They show the artistic-aesthetic survey of the manmade landscape and nature. His intuition for those structures and characteristics is unmistakable.
His photos have been published in several calendars and books.

Works 
Books
 Klaus Leidorf, Peter Ettel: Burgen in Bayern. 7000 Jahre Burgengeschichte im Luftbild, Konrad Theiss Verlag Stuttgart, 1999,  
 München neu entdecken, Kiebitz Buch Verlag, 2002, 
 Übersicht: Luftbilder von Klaus Leidorf, Verlag Marie Leidorf GmbH, 2002, 
 Klaus Leidorf (Luftbilder), R.W.B. McCormack (Texte): Hoch über MÜNCHEN, Kulturverlag Starnberg, 2009, 
 Klaus Leidorf: Hoch über Bayern: Einmalige Entdeckungen aus der Vogelperspektive, Volk Verlag München, 2011, 
 Klaus Leidorf: Hoch über Bayern 2: Neue erstaunliche Entdeckungen aus der Vogelperspektive, Volk Verlag München, 2012, 
Calendars
 Klaus Leidorf: Wandkalender Starnberger See 2009, Kulturverlag Starnberg, 
 Klaus Leidorf: Wandkalender Hoch über Bayern – Monatskalender 2013, Volk Verlag München, 2012,

References

 Photo Gallery on COLOSSAL
 Article Wall Street Journal
 Photo Gallery on PHOTOGRAPHY COOL
 Photo Gallery on mother nature network
 Archäologie Leidorf - Erkenntnisse im Überflug
 Abheben und Staunen - Das Grüne Band von oben
 Luftbildarchäologe Der andere Pilot
 Erstaunliche Entdeckungen des Niedererlbachers Klaus Leidorf
 Breathtaking Aerial Photography by Klaus Leidorf
 Sky's the Limit - Klaus Leidorf offers a bird's eye view from his Cessna 172

External links 
 Klaus Leidorf Luftbilddokumentation
 Aerial Photography

Aerial photographers
1956 births
Living people
Photographers from North Rhine-Westphalia
Archaeologists from North Rhine-Westphalia
People from Bonn